"Native Love (Step By Step)" is a single by American performance artist Divine, released in 1982. The song also appeared on Divine's first album, Jungle Jezebel (titled My First Album in some territories), in 1982 and was later reissued on the 1984 compilation album The Story So Far. It was produced by Bobby Orlando.

Chart performance
"Native Love (Step By Step)" became Divine's first single to chart on the Dutch Singles Chart.  It debuted at #37 before climbing to and peaking at #28 in its second week.  The song spent a total of 11 weeks on the chart.

"Native Love (Step By Step)" remains Divine's highest charting song on the U.S. Hot Dance Club Songs, where it peaked at #21.

Track listing
Dutch Vinyl, 12-inch single
 "Native Love (Step By Step) (Dance Mix)" - 5:10
 "Native Love (Step By Step) (Remixed Version/ USA Remix)" - 8:13

Song usage
"Native Love (Step By Step)" was used in the movie An Englishman in New York.

Charts

References

1982 singles
Divine (performer) songs
1982 songs
Songs written by Bobby Orlando
Song recordings produced by Bobby Orlando